Myopsyche ochsenheimeri is a moth of the subfamily Arctiinae. It was described by Jean Baptiste Boisduval in 1829. It is found in Cameroon, the Republic of the Congo and Nigeria.

References

 

Arctiinae
Moths described in 1829